"Ready For Your Love" is the third digital single (sixth overall) by South Korean singer J-Min. It was released as a CD and digital single by S.M. Entertainment on August 9, 2016 and distributed by KT Music.

Background and composition
On August 5, 2016 S.M. Entertainment announced that J-Min would be releasing her new digital single "Ready For Your Love" and its B-side track "Song On My Guitar" on August 9. The title track "Ready For Your Love" is an urban-pop, which describe about a woman who is ready for new love after overcoming the pains for the past and the B-side track "Song On My Guitar" is a modern rock, which is the Korean version of the track  from her Japanese album, "Cross The Border".

The music video of the title track   "Ready For Your Love"  was starring by her and SMRookies Johnny.

Track listing

References

2016 songs
2016 singles
SM Entertainment singles
Korean-language songs